Kim Birke (born 29 December 1987) is a German handball player for VfL Oldenburg and the German national team.

References

1987 births
Living people
German female handball players
Sportspeople from Hanover